Stephen Allen Robinett (13 July 1941 – 16 February 2004) was an American writer of science-fiction and mystery novels and short stories.

Robinett's first publication appeared in the March 1969 edition of the magazine Analog Science Fiction and Fact, the novelette "Minitalent", which was published with his most-used pseudonym, Tak Hallus (derived from the Persian takhallus). By the mid-1970s, however, he had begun using his own name. He published two novels, Stargate and The Man Responsible during the mid-1970s, and continued to publish novels and short fiction until the early 1990s.

He also wrote extensively in the area of business journalism and was a lawyer licensed in California.

He died on 16 February 2004 from complications caused by Hodgkins disease.

Bibliography

Novels
Mindwipe! (1976) (as Steve Hahn)
 Stargate (1976)
 The Man Responsible (1978)
 Final Option (1990)
 Unfinished Business (1990)

Collections
Projections (1979)

References

1941 births
2004 deaths
20th-century American novelists
American male novelists
American science fiction writers
American male short story writers
20th-century American short story writers
20th-century American male writers